National Highway 146B, commonly referred to as NH 146B is a national highway in  India. It is a spur road of National Highway 46. NH-146B traverses the state of Madhya Pradesh in India.

Route 

Budhni, Kosmi, Rehti, Nasrullaganj.

Junctions  

  Terminal near Budhni.

See also 

 List of National Highways in India
 List of National Highways in India by state

References

External links 

 NH 146B on OpenStreetMap

National highways in India
National Highways in Madhya Pradesh